Michael William Shumann (born October 13, 1955) is a former American football wide receiver and former sports reporter for KGO-TV in San Francisco. He is a member of the Florida State Seminoles Hall of Fame.

Wide Receiver
  
One of Florida State's most proficient pass receivers was Tallahassee native Mike Shumann. Hailing from the same high school that produced Hall of Famers Jimmy Jordan and Wally Woodham, Shumann set records for pass receptions and yardage gained during his years at Florida State, 1973-75 and '77. His best year at Florida State was '74 when he grabbed 43 passes for 515 yards. In '75 he topped that yardage gained, bringing in 38 passes for 730 yards. Returning in '77 after a one year absence, he finished his senior year with the Tribe as the second leading receiver with 33 receptions for 701 yards. For his career, Shumann had 134 receptions for 2,306 yards and 16 touchdowns. Those total ranks second, third, and sixth, respectively, on the all-time Seminole receiving lists. His efforts earned him first-team All-South Independent honors. Following his career with Florida State, Shumann signed with the San Francisco Forty Niners as a free agent in 1978 and remained with the club for three years, and he played in the Super Bowl game against Cincinnati in 1981[1]. 

Sportscaster

Mike Shumann is an Emmy award winning Sportscaster and Super Bowl Champion with the San Francisco 49ers. He is also a member of the Florida State Hall of Fame. His insights and humor on and off the field are second to none.

After an eight year career in professional football Mike put his degree to work in Broadcasting. He spent 7 years in radio hosting 49er Pre and post game shows and was also the teams sideline reporter. That led to a 25 year career at ABC7 as an anchor/reporter and analyst. Mike has covered Super Bowls with the Raiders and 49ers, World Series with the SF Giants, NBA finals with the GS Warriors and a Stanley Cup with the SJ Sharks.

His rare insight as a player and broadcaster is hard to match.

From stories with teammates like Joe Montana to covering athletes like Buster Posey and Steph Curry will captivate your audience.
Mike also had to overcome several obstacles to reach the summit and talks about his motivation and drive to become a Super Bowl Champion[2].

References

https://nolefan.org/football/shumann_mike.html
https://www.thebash.com/sports-speaker/mike-shumann

External links

1955 births
Living people
American football wide receivers
Florida State Seminoles football players
San Francisco 49ers players
Tampa Bay Buccaneers players
St. Louis Cardinals (football) players
Players of American football from Louisville, Kentucky